Melanie Woering (born 18 January 1992) is a Dutch racing cyclist. Her twin sister, Henriette Woering, also competed professionally as a cyclist.

See also
 List of 2015 UCI Women's Teams and riders

References

External links

1992 births
Living people
Dutch female cyclists
People from Assen
Dutch twins
Twin sportspeople
Cyclists from Drenthe
21st-century Dutch women